Qabaq Tappeh (also Romanized as Qabāq Tappeh and Qabaq Tepe; also known as Ghabagh Tappeh Hajebloo, Qābākh Tappeh, and Qapāq Tepe) is a village in Raheb Rural District, in the Central District of Kabudarahang County, Hamadan Province, Iran. At the 2006 census, there were 889 families and 3,653 people living there.

References 

Populated places in Kabudarahang County